Henry Lohmann (14 February 1924 – 4 October 1967) was a Danish film actor. He appeared in 24 films between 1954 and 1967.

Selected filmography
 The Poet and the Little Mother (1959)
 Forelsket i København (1960)
 The Heir to Næsbygaard (1965)
 Neighbours (1966)
 Brødrene på Uglegaarden (1967)

External links

1924 births
1967 deaths
Danish male film actors
People from Odense Municipality
20th-century Danish male actors